The Millicent state by-election, 1968 was a by-election held on 22 June 1968 for the South Australian House of Assembly seat of Millicent.

Results
The by-election was triggered by the Court of Disputed Returns calling a new election. Labor had won the seat by a single vote at the 1968 election. Labor retained the seat with an increased margin. Turnout increased at the by-election.

See also
List of South Australian state by-elections

References

South Australian state by-elections
1968 elections in Australia
1960s in South Australia
June 1968 events in Australia